Thomas de Melsonby (died after 1244) was a medieval Bishop of Durham-elect and Prior of Durham.

Melsonby was the son of the rector of Melsonby. He was prior of a cell at Coldingham before being elected prior of Durham Cathedral in about 1233. He was elected to the see of Durham on 1 June 1237 but King Henry III of England objected. After lawsuits, Melsonby resigned the bishopric. He remained prior until 1244 when he resigned that office. He died sometime after 1244.

Citations

References
 
 

Bishops of Durham
Priors of Durham
13th-century English Roman Catholic bishops